In Greek mythology, Chalcis or  Khalkis (Ancient Greek: Χαλκίς) was a naiad as one of the daughters of the river-god Asopus and Metope, the river-nymph daughter of the river Ladon. Her name means "a brazen pot" from χαλκόν chalcon "bronze".

Family 
Chalcis was the sister of Pelasgus (Pelagon), Ismenus, Corcyra, Salamis, Aegina, Peirene, Cleone, Thebe, Tanagra, Thespia, Asopis, Sinope, Ornea and Harpina. According to others, she was the mother of the Curetes and Corybantes, the former of whom were among the earliest inhabitants of Chalcis.

Mythology 
The town of Chalcis in Euboea was said to have derived its name from Chalcis. She may be identical with Euboea or Combe, daughters of Asopus in some myths.

Notes

References 

 Diodorus Siculus, The Library of History translated by Charles Henry Oldfather. Twelve volumes. Loeb Classical Library. Cambridge, Massachusetts: Harvard University Press; London: William Heinemann, Ltd. 1989. Vol. 3. Books 4.59–8. Online version at Bill Thayer's Web Site
 Diodorus Siculus, Bibliotheca Historica. Vol 1-2. Immanel Bekker. Ludwig Dindorf. Friedrich Vogel. in aedibus B. G. Teubneri. Leipzig. 1888-1890. Greek text available at the Perseus Digital Library.
 Stephanus of Byzantium, Stephani Byzantii Ethnicorum quae supersunt, edited by August Meineike (1790-1870), published 1849. A few entries from this important ancient handbook of place names have been translated by Brady Kiesling. Online version at the Topos Text Project.
 Strabo, The Geography of Strabo. Edition by H.L. Jones. Cambridge, Mass.: Harvard University Press; London: William Heinemann, Ltd. 1924. Online version at the Perseus Digital Library.
 Strabo, Geographica edited by A. Meineke. Leipzig: Teubner. 1877. Greek text available at the Perseus Digital Library.

Naiads
Nymphs
Children of Asopus